Rainer Bastuck (born 10 March 1960 in Lebach) is a German auto racing driver and entrepreneur. He founded Bastuck & Co GmbH, an automotive parts company based in Lebach.

Career
Bastuck has regularly competed in what is currently known as the ADAC Procar Series since 2001, finishing third overall for Maurer Motorsport in 2006. He is a Triumph enthusiast and often competes in historic racing.

Bastuck competed in one round of the 2006 World Touring Car Championship season with Maurer Motorsport in a Chevrolet Lacetti, at the Race of the Czech Republic at Masaryk Circuit near Brno. He finished the two races in 22nd and 20th place.

References

External links
Bastuck company website

1960 births
German racing drivers
Living people
People from Lebach
Racing drivers from Saarland
World Touring Car Championship drivers
European Touring Car Championship drivers
Nürburgring 24 Hours drivers